Rauber is a surname. Notable people with the surname include:

Francis D. Rauber (1901–1991), American second Sergeant Major of the Marine Corps
François Rauber (1933–2003), French pianist, composer, arranger and conductor
Karl Rauber (1866–1909), Swiss painter
Karl-Josef Rauber (born 1934), German cardinal of the Catholic Church
Paul Rauber, American environmentalists
Ty Rauber (1905–1949), American football player, Navy Commander and special agent with the FBI

See also
Rauberflaket, is a mountain of Buskerud, in southern Norway

References